Penny Brahms (born Penelope K. Brams in 1951) is a British model and film and television actress whose career was active in the 1960s and 1970s. She co-starred with Joanna Lumley in the 1971 sex comedy Games That Lovers Play.

Selected filmography
 The Wrong Box (1966) – Twittering Female on Moors (uncredited)
 The Ambushers (1967) – Slaygirl
 Hammerhead (1968) – Frieda
 2001: A Space Odyssey (1968) – Stewardess #1
 Up Pompeii! (1970,Se1,Ep1).
 The Private Life of Sherlock Holmes (1970) – Girl (uncredited)
 She'll Follow You Anywhere (1971) – Mary Cawfield
 Games That Lovers Play (1971) – Constance
 Percy (1971) – Football Fan (uncredited)
 Bread (1971) – Jan
 Dracula A.D. 1972 (1972) – Hippy Girl (final film role)

References

Bibliography
 James L. Limbacher. Sexuality in world cinema, Volume 2. Scarecrow Press, 1983.

External links
 

Possibly living people
British film actresses
British television actresses
British female models
1951 births